Polje is a karst feature.

Polje also translates as field from Serbo-Croatian and may also refer to:

Slovenia
 Polje, Ljubljana, a former village, now part of Ljubljana, Slovenia
 Polje, Bohinj, a village near Bohinj, Slovenia
 Polje, Tolmin, a village near Tolmin, Slovenia

Bosnia and Herzegovina
 Polje, Busovača, a village near Busovača, Bosnia and Herzegovina
 Polje (Cazin), a village near Cazin, Bosnia and Herzegovina
 Polje (Derventa), a village near Derventa, Bosnia and Herzegovina
 Polje (Kalinovik), a village near Kalinovik, Bosnia and Herzegovina
 Polje, Kreševo, a village near Kreševo, Bosnia and Herzegovina
 Polje, Velika Kladuša, a village near Velika Kladuša, Bosnia and Herzegovina
 Polje (Višegrad), a village near Višegrad, Bosnia and Herzegovina

Montenegro
 Polje, Bar, a village near Bar

Croatia
 Polje (Krk), a village on the island of Krk, Croatia